This is the complete list of men's African Games medalists in swimming from 1965 to 2019. Before 2015 it was known as the All-Africa Games.

Men's events

50m Freestyle

100m Freestyle

200m Freestyle

400m Freestyle

800m Freestyle

1500m Freestyle

50m Backstroke

100m Backstroke

200m Backstroke

50m Breaststroke

100m Breaststroke

200m Breaststroke

50m Butterfly

100m Butterfly

200m Butterfly

200m I.M.

400m I.M

4 × 100 m Free Relay

4 × 200 m Free Relay

4 × 100 m Medley Relay

References

medalists
Lists of swimming medalists